The director of the Federal Bureau of Investigation is the head of the Federal Bureau of Investigation, a United States' federal law enforcement agency, and is responsible for its day-to-day operations. The FBI director is appointed for a single 10-year term by the president of the United States and confirmed by the Senate. The FBI is an agency within the Department of Justice (DOJ), and thus the director reports to the attorney general of the United States.

The director briefed the president on any issues that arose from within the FBI until the Intelligence Reform and Terrorism Prevention Act of 2004 was enacted following the September 11 attacks. Since then, the director reports in an additional capacity to the director of national intelligence, as the FBI is also part of the United States Intelligence Community.

The current director is Christopher A. Wray, who assumed the role on August 2, 2017, after being confirmed by the United States Senate, taking over from Acting Director Andrew McCabe after the dismissal of former Director James Comey by President Donald Trump.

Term of office 
The FBI director is appointed by the president and, since 1972, subject to confirmation by the Senate. J. Edgar Hoover, appointed by President Calvin Coolidge to the predecessor office of Director of the Bureau of Investigation in 1924, was by far the longest-serving director, holding the position from its establishment under the current title in 1935 until his death in 1972. In 1976, in response to Hoover's lengthy tenure and during the Watergate era, by an amendment to the 1968 Omnibus Crime Control Act, Congress limited the term of future FBI directors to ten years, "an unusually long tenure that Congress established to insulate the director from political pressure." This rule was waived by the Senate for Robert Mueller on July 27, 2011, due to serious security concerns at that time. Since 1976, Directors serve a ten-year term unless they resign, die, or are removed, but in practice, since Hoover, none have served a full ten years, except Mueller who served twelve years with the leave of Congress.

The director of the FBI can be removed from office by the president of the United States. After removal and until a replacement is confirmed by the U.S. Senate, the deputy director automatically acts in the role. The appointment of the deputy director is not a presidential appointment and does not require Senate confirmation. The president can appoint an interim director pending Senate confirmation or nominate a permanent director.

Responsibilities
Along with the deputy director, the director is responsible for ensuring that cases and operations are handled correctly. The director also is in charge of staffing the leadership in any one of the FBI field offices with qualified agents.

Lists of officeholders

Bureau of Investigation chiefs and directors (1908–1935) 
When the Bureau of Investigation (BOI) was established in 1908, its head was called Chief of the Bureau of Investigation. It was changed to the Director of the Bureau of Investigation in the term of William J. Flynn (1919–1921) and to its current name when the BOI was renamed FBI in 1935.

Federal Bureau of Investigation directors (1935–present) 
The FBI became an independent service within the Department of Justice in 1935. In the same year, its name was officially changed to the present-day Federal Bureau of Investigation (FBI), with J. Edgar Hoover receiving the current title of Director of the Federal Bureau of Investigation. Since 1972, the United States Senate has to confirm the nomination of a permanent officeholder.

Line of succession 
The line of succession for the director of the FBI is as follows:

 Deputy Director of the Federal Bureau of Investigation
 Associate Deputy Director of the Federal Bureau of Investigation
 Executive Assistant Director of the National Security Branch
 Executive Assistant Director for Criminal, Cyber, Response and Services
 Assistant Director of Counterterrorism Division
 Assistant Director of Criminal Investigative Division
 Assistant Director of Counterintelligence Division
 Assistant Director, Washington Field Office
 Assistant Director, New York Field Office
 Assistant Director, Los Angeles Field Office

Dismissals 
Since the office's inception, only two directors have been dismissed: William S. Sessions by President Bill Clinton in 1993, and James Comey by President Donald Trump in 2017.

William S. Sessions  
Just before Bill Clinton was inaugurated as the 42nd president of the United States on January 20, 1993, allegations of ethical improprieties were made against Sessions. A report by outgoing Attorney General William P. Barr presented to the Justice Department that month by the Office of Professional Responsibility included criticisms that he had used an FBI plane to travel to visit his daughter on several occasions, and had a security system installed in his home at government expense. Janet Reno, the 78th Attorney General of the United States, announced that Sessions had exhibited "serious deficiencies in judgment."

Although Sessions denied that he had acted improperly, he was pressured to resign in early July, with some suggesting that President Clinton was giving Sessions the chance to step down in a dignified manner. Sessions refused, saying that he had done nothing wrong, and insisted on staying in office until his successor was confirmed. As a result, President Clinton dismissed Sessions on July 19, 1993, five and a half years into a ten-year term. Clinton's public explanation was that there had been a loss of confidence in Sessions’ leadership, and then-Attorney General Reno recommended the dismissal.

Ronald Kessler's book, The FBI: Inside the World's Most Powerful Law Enforcement Agency, led to the dismissal by President Clinton of Sessions as FBI director over his abuses. According to The Washington Post, "A Justice Department official...noted that the original charges against Sessions came not from FBI agents but from a journalist, Ronald Kessler [who uncovered the abuses while writing a book about the FBI, leading to Sessions' dismissal by President Clinton]..." The New York Times said Kessler's FBI book "did indeed trigger bureau and Justice Department investigations into alleged travel and expense abuses [by FBI Director William Sessions, leading to his departure]...

Clinton nominated Louis Freeh to be FBI Director on July 20. Then-FBI deputy director Floyd I. Clarke, who Sessions suggested had led a coup to force his removal, served as acting director until September 1, 1993, when Freeh was sworn in.

James Comey 

On May 9, 2017, President Trump dismissed Comey after the recommendation of United States Attorney General Jeff Sessions and Deputy Attorney General Rod Rosenstein. Rosenstein's memorandum to Sessions objected to Comey's conduct in the investigation into Hillary Clinton's emails. This was contradicted by multiple unnamed sources to news outlets, who said that Trump and high-level officials personally asked for Comey to be fired. Comey was fired after he asked for more money for the investigations into Russian interference in the 2016 United States elections. Many members of Congress, mostly Democrats, expressed concern over the firing and argued that it would put the integrity of the investigation into jeopardy.

Comey's termination was immediately controversial, even being characterized as corrupt by news commentators. It was compared, by the aforementioned news outlets, to the Saturday Night Massacre, President Richard Nixon's termination of special prosecutor Archibald Cox, who had been investigating the Watergate scandal, and to the firing of Acting Attorney General Sally Yates in January 2017.

In the dismissal letter Trump stated that Comey had asserted “on three separate occasions that I am not under investigation" which was later confirmed by Comey to the Senate while under oath. This is disputed by reporting from multiple news agencies with multiple sources. According to the reporting, Trump had been openly talking about firing Mr. Comey for at least a week before his dismissal. Trump and Democratic leaders had long questioned Comey's judgment. Moreover, Trump was angry that Comey would not support his claim that President Barack Obama had his campaign offices wiretapped, frustrated when Comey revealed in Senate testimony the breadth of the counterintelligence investigation into Russia's effort to sway the 2016 U.S. presidential election and that Comey was giving too much attention to the Russia probe and not to internal leaks within the government. On May 8, 2017, he gave Attorney General Jeff Sessions and Deputy Attorney General Rosenstein a directive to explain in writing a case against Comey. That directive was forwarded to Trump as a recommendation to dismiss Comey the following day, which Trump did.

Comey first learned of his termination from television news reports that flashed on screen while he was delivering a speech to agents at the Los Angeles Field Office. Sources said he was surprised and caught off guard by the termination. Comey immediately departed for Washington, D.C., and was forced to cancel his scheduled speech that night at an FBI recruitment event at the Directors Guild of America in Hollywood, California.

In the absence of a Senate-confirmed FBI director, Deputy Director Andrew McCabe automatically became the acting director, serving until the confirmation of Christopher Wray.

See also 

 Chief, IRS Criminal Investigation
 Director of the Central Intelligence Agency
 Director of the United States Marshals Service
 Director of the United States Secret Service
 Federal law enforcement in the United States

References

External links

 

 Directors of the FBI

FBI Director
1908 establishments in the United States